Christopher John Purshouse (born September 1992) is an English former first-class cricketer.

Purshouse was born at Rotherham in September 1992. He was educated at Worksop College, before going up to Durham University. While studying at Durham, he played two first-class cricket matches for Durham MCCU against Derbyshire and Durham in 2014. He struggled against first-class county opposition, scoring just 19 runs in his two matches.

References

External links

1992 births
Living people
People from Rotherham
People educated at Worksop College
Alumni of Durham University
English cricketers
Durham MCCU cricketers